The Knights of Rizal is an Order of Chivalry from the Philippines, created to honor and uphold the ideals of Philippine national hero José Rizal.

The civic organisation of the "Order of the Knights of Rizal" was established in 1911 by Colonel Antonio C. Torres, who later served as the first Filipino chief of police of Manila. The Order was granted a legislative charter by President Elpidio Quirino as a non-sectarian, non-partisan, civic, patriotic, and cultural organization under Republic Act 646 on June 14, 1951. Although not a state order, it is the one order of knighthood in the Philippines officially recognized and endorsed by an official act of the national government, and its awards and titles are recognized by the Honors code of the Philippines as official awards of the Republic. The Order is often worn by members of the Philippine government and diplomatic corps. The insignia of the Order of the Knights of Rizal is ranked seventh in the Order of Wear pursuant to the Implementing Rules and Regulations of the Honors Code of the Philippines.

Since its founding, the Order has grown to more than 25,000 members belonging to 131 active chapters in the Philippines and 61 active chapters around the world. Its international headquarters is located on Bonifacio Drive in Port Area, Manila.

History
The Order of the Knights of Rizal was first organized out of a group of nine men by Manila Police Chief Colonel Antonio Torres on Rizal Day, December 30, 1911 commemorate martyrdom of Philippine national hero, Dr. José Rizal. Exactly a year later, a state funeral was held to transfer Rizal's remains from his family's house in Binondo, Manila for a wake in the Ayuntamiento and finally a burial in Luneta where the Order of the Knights of Rizal acted as the honor guards. Since then, the order has led commemorations of Rizal's birth anniversaries and plays a prominent role during Rizal Day ceremonies commemorating his death anniversary.

In 1951, the order pushed for filing a bill in the Philippine Congress to grant the Order of the Knights of Rizal a legislative charter. Senators Enrique Magalona, Lorenzo Sumulong, Esteban Abada, Emiliano Tria Tirona, Camilo Osías, Geronima Pécson, José Avelino and Ramon Torres sponsored the bill in the Senate while Congressman Manuel Zola of Cebu was the principal sponsor in the House of Representatives. The bill was signed into law by Philippine President Elpidio Quirino on June 14, 1951 as Republic Act 646. The Bill constitutes an official recognition of the inestimable value to the nation and the world of Rizal's teachings and the wisdom necessity of inculcating in the minds and hearts of people so they may follow and practice them.

Supreme Council
As set forth by Philippine Republic Act 646, the general administration and direction of the affairs of the Order is in the hands of a Supreme Council (Board of Directors) of nine members including the Supreme Commander, Deputy Supreme Commander, Supreme Chancellor, Supreme Pursuivant, Supreme Exchequer, Supreme Archivist, Supreme Auditor, Deputy Supreme Pursuivant and Deputy Supreme Exchequer. The Supreme Council Trustees serve the Supreme Council for two (2) years, with maximum of two (2) re-elections as stated in the Amended By-Laws.

The present Supreme Commander of the Knights of Rizal is Sir Gerardo "Gerry" V. Calderon, KGCR, also the Vice Mayor of the town of Angono, Rizal; with Sir Raymundo "Munding" A. del Rosario, KGOR, also Vice Mayor of Tanza, Cavite as his Deputy Supreme Commander, Sir Armando Cazzola, KGOR, Sir Emmanuel F. Calairo, KGOR, Sir Frisco S. San Juan, Jr, KGOR, Sir Danilo C. Peralta, KGOR, Sir Ferdinand G. Suba, KGCR, Sir Meliton B. Garraton, KGCR, and Sir Rodel C. Abellana, KGOR.

Activities
Unlike other orders of the Philippines, the Knights of Rizal is an active order. Membership does not only convey privilege but requires continuous participation in the year-long projects of the Order.

Aside from leading or taking an active part in official and diplomatic ceremonies commemorating important dates in Dr. José Rizal's life and the Philippine Independence Day, the Knights of Rizal also focus on Filipino youth across the world such as the annual National Rizal Youth Leadership Institute Conference and the Middle East and Africa Region Inter-School Academic, Talent and Skills Competition held for Philippine schools in the Middle East.

Privileges
Aside from the wearing of the Order's decorations during appropriate occasions, a specific prefix also applies.

Knights of the Order prefix "Sir" to their forenames and add the relevant post-nominal according to their rank at the end of their names while wives of Knights prefix "Lady" to their first names. These apply to both spoken and written forms of address.

Ranks

Other awards and decorations
 Medal of Recognition
 Distinguished Service Medal
 Distinguished Service Star
 Distinguished Service Cross
 Rizal Pro Patria Award

For Women and Ladies Auxilary

Teodora Alonzo Award
Rizal Women of Malolos Award

Prominent recipients

Presidents of the Philippines 
 Emilio Aguinaldo (1899-1901).
 José P. Laurel (1943-1945). 
 Manuel L. Quezon (1935-1944). 
 Carlos P. Garcia (1957-1961).
 Diosdado Macapagal (1961-1965).
 Ferdinand E. Marcos (1965-1986).
 Fidel V. Ramos (1992-1998).
 Joseph Estrada (1998-2001).
 Gloria Macapagal-Arroyo (2001-2010).
Was conferred the Teodora Alonzo Award by the Order. 
 Benigno Aquino III (2010-2016).
 Rodrigo Duterte (2016-2022).

Members of Philippine Senate and House of Representatives 
Benigno S. Aquino Jr.: Senator of the Philippines. Governor of Tarlac. Husband to President Corazon Aquino,  the first female President of the Philippines, and father to President Benigno Aquino III.
Jovito Salonga: First Chairman of the Presidential Commission on Good Government and President of the Senate of the Philippines.
Feliciano Belmonte Jr.: Speaker of the House of Representatives of the Philippines.
Pia S. Cayetano: Senator of the Philippines. 
Was conferred the Rizal Women of Malolos Award by the Order.

Cabinet Secretaries and Ministers of the Philippines 
Fernando Lopez: Vice President of the Philippines. Secretary of Agriculture, Senator, and Natural Resources and Chairman of ABS-CBN Corporation.
Salvador Laurel: Vice President of the Philippines. Prime Minister and Secretary of Foreign Affairs.
Cesar Virata: Prime Minister of the Philippines.
Jose D. Lina Jr.: Secretary of the Interior and Local Government, Governor of Laguna, Governor of Metro Manila, and Senator of the Philippines. Supreme Commander of the Order.
Delfin Lorenzana: Secretary of National Defense and Chairman of the National Task Force against COVID-19.

Chief Justices of the Philippines 
 Hilario Davide Jr.: Chief Justice of the Philippines, Philippine Representative to the United Nations, and Supreme Commander of the Order.
Claudio Teehankee: Chief Justice and Secretary of Justice of the Philippines. Supreme Commander of the Order.
Reynato Puno: Chief Justice of the Philippines. Supreme Commander of the Order.

Artists of the Philippines 
Juan F. Nakpil:  National Artist of the Philippines. Supreme Commander of the Order.
Jhett Tolentino: Entertainment Producer and first Filipino to win both a Grammy Award and a Tony Award for his work in the entertainment industry.

Philippine Diplomatic Corps 
Carlos P. Romulo: President of the United Nations General Assembly. President of the University of the Philippines, Philippine Ambassador to the United States, Secretary of Foreign Affairs, and Secretary of Education.
León María Guerrero III: Philippine Ambassador to the United Kingdom, India, Spain, Mexico, and Yugoslavia.
Jose L. Cuisia Jr.: Philippine Ambassador to the United States. Governor of the Central Bank of the Philippines.
Victor G. Garcia III: Philippine Ambassador to the Russian Federation, Austria, Croatia, Slovenia, Bosnia-Herzegovina,and Philippine Permanent Resident to international organizations in Vienna, Austria. Signatory for the UN Convention Against Transnational Organized Crime.
Jose S. Laurel III: Philippine Ambassador to Japan. Supreme Commander of the Order.
Eduardo de Vega, KGOR  : Philippine Ambassador to Mexico, Belgium,  Luxembourg, and the European Union.
Philippe Lhuillier: Philippine Ambassador to Italy, Albania, San Merino, and Spain.
Jesus S. Domingo: Philippine Ambassador to New Zealand, Cook Islands, Fiji, Samoa and Tonga.

Foreign Recipients of the Order 
 Juan Carlos I: King of Spain.
  Henry Kissinger: Secretary of State of the United States of America.
  Anwar Ibrahim: 10th Prime Minister of Malaysia.
  Itthiphol Khunpluem: Thai Minister of Culture and Mayor of Pattaya. 
  Tobias Enverga: Philippine-born Canadian Senator for Ontario. 
 Britgitte Ayrault: Wife of the Prime Minister of France. 
 Was conferred the Rizal Women of Malolos Award for her charity work with Filipino children. 
  Austin Coates: British civil servant and author. Wrote “Rizal: Philippine Nationalist and Martyr“ (1968).
   John Ensign: United States Senator of the State of Nevada.
  Daisaku Ikeda: President of Soka Gakkai organization in Japan.
  Kiyoshi Sumiya: Japanese Ambassador to the Philippines.
 Anthony Housefather: Member of the Canadian Parliament and Mayor of Côte Saint-Luc.
 Heng Sokkung: Cambodian Secretary of State of the Ministry of Industry, Science, Technology & Innovation.
 Grégoire Vardakis: Belgian Ambassador to the Philippines.
 Billy C Chan: Chairman of the Board, Sino Phil Asia International Peace Awards Foundation, Vice Chair of Australian Chamber of Commerce Macao 
  Emanuel Jones: USA Georgia State Senator since 2005, Senate Committee on Economic Development and International Relations. 
  Harley Seyedin: Winner of the 2017 Oslo Business for Peace Award, Awarded by a Committee of Nobel Laureates in Peace and Economics.
  Kevin Thompson of Glenelg OBE, Legion d'honneur, Officer dans l'Ordere des Arts et des Lettres, founding principle of the Royal Birmingham Conservatoire

Other Prominent Members 
Antonio C. Torres: First Filipino Chief of Manila Police Department (MPD), Founder of the Order.
Gabriel A. Daza: Charter member of the Boy Scouts of the Philippines (BSP). Supreme Exchequer and of the Order.
Hermenegildo Reyes: Co-Founder of the University of the East. Supreme Commander of the Order.

References

External links 
knightsofrizal.org.ph (Philippine Supreme Council Headquarters)
Who is entitled to the prefix of ‘Sir’?

Organizations based in the Philippines
José Rizal
Mutual organizations
1911 establishments in the Philippines
Honours systems
Philippine awards